Postmodern feminism is a mix of post-structuralism, postmodernism, and French feminism. The goal of postmodern feminism is to destabilize the patriarchal norms entrenched in society that have led to gender inequality. Postmodern feminists seek to accomplish this goal through rejecting essentialism, philosophy, and universal truths in favor of embracing the differences that exist amongst women to demonstrate that not all women are the same. These ideologies are rejected by postmodern feminists because they believe if a universal truth is applied to all woman of society, it minimizes individual experience, hence they warn  women to be aware of ideas displayed as the norm in society since it may stem from masculine notions of how women should be portrayed.

Postmodern feminists seek to analyze any notions that have led to gender inequality in society. Postmodern feminists analyze these notions and attempt to promote equality of gender through critiquing logocentrism, supporting multiple discourses, deconstructing texts, and seeking to promote subjectivity. Postmodern feminists are accredited with drawing attention to dichotomies in society and demonstrating how language influences the difference in treatment of genders.

The inclusion of postmodern theory into feminist theory is not readily accepted by all feminists—some believe postmodern thought undermines the attacks that feminist theory attempts to create, while other feminists are in favor of the union.

Origins and theory

Butler
Postmodern feminism's major departure from other branches of feminism is perhaps the argument that sex, or at least gender, is itself constructed through language, a view notably propounded in Judith Butler's 1990 book, Gender Trouble. They draw on and critique the work of Simone de Beauvoir, Michel Foucault, and Jacques Lacan, as well as on Luce Irigaray's argument that what we conventionally regard as 'feminine' is only a reflection of what is constructed as masculine.

Butler criticises the distinction drawn by previous feminisms between (biological) sex and (socially constructed) gender. They ask why we assume that material things (such as the body) are not subject to processes of social construction themselves. Butler argues that this does not allow for a sufficient criticism of essentialism: though recognizing that gender is a social construct, feminists assume it is always constructed in the same way. Butler's argument implies that women's subordination has no single cause or single solution; postmodern feminism is thus criticized for offering no clear path to action.  Butler rejects the term "postmodernism" as too vague to be meaningful.

Paula Moya argues that Butler derives this rejection to postmodernism from misreadings of Cherríe Moraga's work. "She reads Moraga's statement that 'the danger lies in ranking the oppressions' to mean that we have no way of adjudicating among different kinds of oppressions—that any attempt to casually relate or hierarchize the varieties of oppressions people suffer constitutes an imperializing, colonizing, or totalizing gesture that renders the effort invalid…thus, although Butler at first appears to have understood the critiques of women who have been historically precluded from occupying the position of the 'subject' of feminism, it becomes clear that their voices have been merely instrumental to her" (Moya, 790) Moya contends that because Butler feels that the varieties of oppressions cannot be summarily ranked, that they cannot be ranked at all; and takes a short-cut by throwing out the idea of not only postmodernism, but women in general.

Frug
Mary Joe Frug suggested that one "principle" of postmodernism is that human experience is located "inescapably within language". Power is exercised not only through direct coercion, but also through the way in which language shapes and restricts our reality. She also stated that because language is always open to re-interpretation, it can also be used to resist this shaping and restriction, and so is a potentially fruitful site of political struggle.

Frug's second postmodern principle is that sex is not something natural, nor is it something completely determinate and definable. Rather, sex is part of a system of meaning, produced by language. Frug argues that "cultural mechanisms ... encode the female body with meanings", and that these cultural mechanisms then go on explain these meanings "by an appeal to the 'natural' differences between the sexes, differences that the rules themselves help to produce".

French feminism
French feminism, as it is known today, is an Anglo-American invention coined by Alice Jardine to be a section in a larger movement of postmodernism in France during the 1980s. This included the theorizing of the failure of the modernist project, along with its departure. More specifically for feminism, it meant returning to the debate of sameness and difference. The term was further defined by Toril Moi, an academic with a focus on feminist theory, in her book Sexual/Textual Politics. In this book she further defined French feminism to only include a few authors such as Hélène Cixous, Luce Irigaray, and Julia Kristeva, while also creating a distinction between French feminism and Anglo-American Feminism. She states that the difference between the two is that Anglo-American feminists want to find a "woman-centered perspective" and a woman identity since they were not given the chance to have one in the past. French Feminists believe there is no identity for a woman but that "the feminine can be identified where difference and otherness are found." Elaine Marks, an academic in the field of Women's Studies, noted another difference between French and American feminists. French feminists, specifically radical feminists, criticized and attacked the systems that benefit men, along with widespread misogyny as a whole, more intensely than their American counterparts. Through American academics contriving their own concept of French feminism, it separated and ignored the already marginalized self-identifying feminists, while focusing on the women theorists associated with Psych et po (Psychanalyse et politique) and other academics who did not always identify as feminists themselves. This division ultimately ended up placing more importance on the theories of the French feminists than the political agenda and goals that groups such as radical feminists and the Mouvement de liberation des femmes (women's liberation movement) had at the time.

Critiques 

There have been many critiques of postmodern feminism since it originated in the 1990s. Most of the criticism has been from modernists and feminists supporting modernist thought. They have put a focus on the themes of relativism and nihilism as defined by postmodernism. Though modernist critics believe more importantly, that through abandoning the values of Enlightenment thought, postmodern feminism "precludes the possibility of liberating political action." This concern can be seen in critics like Meaghan Morris, who have argued that postmodern feminism runs the risk of undercutting the basis of a politics of action based upon gender difference, through its very anti-essentialism. Alison Assiter published the book Enlightened Women to critique postmodernists and postmodern feminists alike, saying that there should be a return to Enlightenment values and modernist feminism. Gloria Steinem has also criticized feminist theory, and especially postmodernist feminist theory, as being overly academic, where discourse that is full of jargon and inaccessible is helpful to no one.

Of the name
The very term "postmodernism" has been criticised by some theorists who have themselves been labelled as postmodern feminists.

See also

References

Bibliography

External links
 'Postmodern Feminism in 3 pages'

 
Third-wave feminism